Kozlovka is a rural locality (a village) in Pochepsky District, Bryansk Oblast, Russia. The population was 15 as of 2013. There is 1 street.

Geography 
Kozlovka is located 35 km northwest of Pochep (the district's administrative centre) by road. Kozlovsky is the nearest rural locality.

References 

Rural localities in Pochepsky District